is a city located in Nara Prefecture, Japan. As of April 1, 2017, the city had an estimated population of 66,400 and 29,713 households. The population density is 4,000 persons per km², and the total area is 16.48 km².

The city continues to develop as a local business and government center in the center of Nara Prefecture.

History 
Inhabited since the Paleolithic age, the city area nurtured paddy field agriculture in the fertile Nara Basin since ancient times. Large keyhole type burial mounds (kofun) were constructed in the northwestern part of the city around the 5th century.

A local samurai family ruled the area in the medieval age, but the lord of Takada perished in 1580 at the hand of a local vassal of the powerful Oda Nobunaga. In the early modern age, the city area developed as a local market town with a big Buddhist temple at its core.

With the introduction of Western Civilization into Japan, a modern spinning factory was set up here at the end of the nineteenth century. Since then, the city became a center of the modern textile industry.

After the Second World War, Takada was designated as a city in 1948. In 1963, the city of Yamatotakada was established, through the arrangement of an Australian Catholic father (Paul Glynn), a sister-city relationship with Lismore, New South Wales, Australia. It is known as the first such relationship between the two countries.

Toshiharu Matsuda, who served as mayor of the city since 1992, resigned in 2003. During his terms of office he executed ambitious construction plans resulting in burdensome debt. He was also criticized for his connection with a gangster boss in the city of Nara. Masakatsu Yoshida, elected as new major in April, 2003, has had to cope with the deteriorating financial problems combined with a curtailed national subsidy and mounting unpaid city tax.

A citizens' group advocates new friendship relation with Jiujiang, Jiangxi Province in central China, though city administrators are still reluctant.

Neighboring municipalities
 Nara Prefecture
 Kashihara
 Gose
 Kashiba
 Katsuragi
 Kōryō

Sister cities

Outside Japan
 Lismore, Australia

Education
 Primary Schools
 Takada Elementary School
 Iwasono Elementary School
 Katashio Elementary School
 Ukiana Elementary School
 Ukiananishi Elementary School
 Junior High Schools
 Takada Junior High School
 Takadanishi Junior High School
 Katashio Junior High School
 High Schools
 Takada High School
 Takadahigashi High School
 Nara Culture High School
 Japan Aviation High School
 Takada Commerce High School
 Universities
 Nara Culture Women's Junior College
 Other
 Bigei Gakuen Vocational School
 Apollo Gakuin Fashion Business School

Transportation

Rail
 West Japan Railway Company
 Wakayama Line; Sakurai Line (Manyō-Mahoroba Line): Takada Station
 Kintetsu Railway
 Osaka Line: Tsukiyama Station-Yamato-Takada Station-Matsuzuka Station
 Minami Osaka Line: Takadashi Station-Ukiana Station

Road
Expressways
Keinawa Expressway
Japan National Route 24
Japan National Route 165
Japan National Route 166
Japan National Route 168

References

External links
 Yamatotakada City official website 
 Yamatotakada City official website 

Cities in Nara Prefecture